Madeleine Barot (4 July 1909 in Châteauroux – 28 December 1995 in Paris) was a French activist and theologian, who was influential in Protestant, humanist, and human rights movements.

Biography 
Madeleine Barot was the daughter of Alexandre Auguste Barot, a literature teacher from Clermont-Ferrand, and Madeleine Kuss. From 1927 to 1934, she began her studies at Sorbonne University in Paris, where she achieved both a graduate degree in History and a diploma in library/archives.  In 1934, she became an intern at the Bibliothèque nationale de France.  She was then hired as a librarian at the École française de Rome, where she worked from June, 1935 to June, 1940.

Barot was active in young Protestant associations through the French Federation of Christian Student Associations, founded in 1895. In July–August 1939, she chaired a committee at the World Conference of Christian Youth in Amsterdam, organized by Willem Visser 't Hooft, which promoted the amalgamation of Protestant movements.  She thus became involved in the prewar resistance movement, inspired by Swiss pastor Karl Barth.

A friend of pastor Marc Boegner, Barot was named Secretary General of Cimade during a meeting of the heads of young Protestant movements on August 15, 1940, replacing Georgette Siegrist. She held that position until 1956.

Madeleine Barot was directly responsible for the presence of Cimade in camps, by first forcing her own way into the Gurs camp thanks to her relentless negotiations with the authorities and then making it a customary feature in all camps. A committed Christian, she also proved to be energetic and well connected nationally as well as internationally.

In 1953, Madeleine Barot was put in charge of the "Men and Women in the Church and Society" department by the World Council of Churches. There, she began important work in carving out a space for women within the church.  She was involved in several important organizations:
 A Commission for Church support in development;
 France's Protestant Federation
 Christian Action For the Abolition of Torture 
 A Conference of Religions for Peace
She also continued her work with Cimade.

In 1988, she was given the status of Righteous Among the Nations on the Yad Vashem Holocaust Memorial, which honours people throughout Europe who directly or indirectly helped to protect and support Jews during the Third Reich.

Barot died on December 28, 1995.

Notes and references

Bibliographic resources 
  Jacques (André), Madeleine Barot. Une indomptable énergie, Genève, éditions du Cerf et Labor et Fides, 1989
 Barot (Madeleine) dir., Itinéraires socialistes chrétiens : jalons sur le christianisme social hier et aujourd’hui : 1882-1982, Genève, Labor et Fides, 1983
 Kévonian (Dzovinar), Dreyfus-Armand (Geneviève), Blanc-Chaléard (Marie-Claude), Amar (Marianne) dir., La Cimade et l'accueil des réfugiés. Identités, répertoires d'actions et politiques de l'asile, 1939-1994, Paris, Presses universitaires de Paris-Ouest, 2013, 265 p.
 Mayeur (Jean-Marie), Encrevé (André), Les Protestants, dictionnaire du monde religieux dans la France contemporaine, Beauchesne / CNRS, 1993, 534 pages, p. 58.

External links
 Madeleine Barot – her activity to save Jews' lives during the Holocaust, at Yad Vashem website	

1909 births
1995 deaths
French Protestant theologians
Calvinist pacifists
20th-century French theologians
20th-century Protestant theologians
Women Christian theologians
People from Châteauroux
French Righteous Among the Nations